Luohe railway station is a station in Yuanhui District, Luohe, Henan. The station is located on Beijing–Guangzhou railway and Mengmiao–Baofeng railway, and serves as the western terminus of Luohe–Fuyang railway.

The station is the northernmost passenger station operated by CR Wuhan.

History
The station was established in 1903.

References

Railway stations in Henan
Stations on the Beijing–Guangzhou Railway
Railway stations in China opened in 1903